Antiviral Research is a monthly peer-reviewed medical journal published by Elsevier covering research on all aspects of the development of drugs, vaccines and immunotherapies against viruses of animals and plants. The journal was established in 1981 and is an official publication of the International Society for Antiviral Research. Like other Elsevier publications, it has been accused of limiting access of publicly funded research to rest of the population, including other scientists and researchers.
The editor-in-chief is Subhash Vasudevan.

Abstracting and indexing 
Antiviral Research is abstracted and indexed in Abstracts on Hygiene and Communicable Diseases, Elsevier BIOBASE, BIOSIS, Current Contents/Life Sciences, EMBASE, MEDLINE, PASCAL, FRANCIS, Science Citation Index, Scopus, and Tropical Diseases Bulletin. According to the Journal Citation Reports, the journal has a 2021 impact factor of 10.103.

References

External links 
 

Microbiology journals
Elsevier academic journals
Publications established in 1981
Pharmacology journals
Monthly journals
Academic journals associated with learned and professional societies